Al-Faisaliyyah, locally al-Ghalah and unpopularly as al-Mamnūʿāt (lit. no-go zone), is a shanty neighborhood and a subject of Baladiyah al-Batha in south-east Riyadh, Saudi Arabia, inhabited mainly by lower-class Afro-Arabs besides having significant presence of Yemenis, Indians, Filipinos and Bangladeshis. Bordered by Southern Ring Road to the south and Eastern Ring Road to the east, it shares proximity with as-Sinaiyah and al-Khalidiyyah neighborhoods to the west and al-Faruq neighborhood to the north.

History 
Al-Faisaliyyah derives its name from King Faisal ibn Abdulaziz. Owing to its ostracized and uninhabited atmosphere, it was previously called 'al-Ghalah''', which basically translates to 'something which is cut-off from the sea'. According to a 2004 article by Al Riyadh, the area was gifted by King Faisal to homeless undocumented African migrants who used to live in al-Malazz and al-Maizilah neighborhoods (behind King Fahd International Stadium).

 Unemployment and security 
Al-Faisaliyyah is one of the most crime-infested areas of Riyadh and has been dubbed by locals as 'al-Mamnūʿāt' (lit. no-go zone), and has one of the highest unemployment ratios in the capital. According to Asharq Al-Awsat'' in 2007, almost sixty percent of the residents living in were undocumented.

References 

Neighbourhoods in Riyadh